The Oswald Nitschke House is located in Kenilworth, Union County, New Jersey, United States. The clapboard wood frame farmhouse was built c. 1880 and added to the National Register of Historic Places on January 17, 2008.

It is named for Oswald J. Nitschke, a mayor of Kenilworth who served three terms and supported Kenilworth's 1907 incorporation.

In 2003, commercial development threatened to demolish the house, but the Kenilworth Historical Society moved the building 1500 feet to save it.

See also
National Register of Historic Places listings in Union County, New Jersey

References

Houses on the National Register of Historic Places in New Jersey
Houses in Union County, New Jersey
National Register of Historic Places in Union County, New Jersey
New Jersey Register of Historic Places
Kenilworth, New Jersey